Walter Jacobi (January 13, 1918 – August 19, 2009) was a rocket scientist and member of the "von Braun rocket group", at Peenemünde (1939–1945) working on the V-2 rockets in World War II.

He was among the scientists to surrender and travel to the United States to provide rocketry expertise via Operation Paperclip. He came to the United States on the first boat, November 16, 1945 with Operation Paperclip and Fort Bliss, Texas (1945–49). He continued his work with the team when they moved to Redstone Arsenal, and he joined Marshall Space Flight Center to work for NASA. He worked on rocket "structure and components." He continued to support the space program and appear at public events until his death.

References

External links
 Walter W. Jacobi Collection, The University of Alabama in Huntsville Archives and Special Collections

German rocket scientists
1918 births
2009 deaths
American aerospace engineers
Early spaceflight scientists
German emigrants to the United States
German spaceflight pioneers
Engineers from Thuringia
V-weapons people
Marshall Space Flight Center
NASA people
Operation Paperclip
20th-century American engineers
People from Saalfeld